Homeric laughter is inextinguishable or irrepressible mirth. The term is derived from the ancient Greek ἄσβεστος γέλως, which Homer uses
 once in the Iliad (1.599) and once in the Odyssey (8.326) for what the other Olympic gods engage in with Hephaestus, when he is limping around serving them nectar and when he has caught his wife Aphrodite in bed with Ares;
 once more in the Odyssey (20.346), for an incapacitating hysteria induced in Penelope's suitors by Athena.
The expression came into English from German Homerisches gelächter.

References

Homer
Greek mythology